The men's 50 metres freestyle at the 2018 World Para Swimming European Championships was held at the National Aquatic Centre in Dublin from 13 to 19 August.  11 classification finals are held in all over this event.

Medalists

* Fantin swam a WR 31.16 in the heats.

See also
List of IPC world records in swimming

References

50 metres freestyle